David Hart (born February 6, 1954) is an American actor and singer best known for his portrayal of Sgt. Parker Williams on the television series In the Heat of the Night (1988 to 1995). 

He has appeared in numerous films. Hart continues to perform in theater around the country, most recently performing as Charlemagne in Pippin and Oscar in The Odd Couple.

He has also appeared in numerous commercials, including IHOP Restaurants, Maxwell House Coffee, Coors Light, John Deere and GE.

Early life
Hart was raised primarily by his mother, Jeanette Lassiter Anderson, in Panama City, Florida. He attended local schools. His father, Lloyd Hart Jr., encouraged him to attend Chipola Jr. College (now Chipola College) after seeing him perform in You're a Good Man, Charlie Brown, produced at Rutherford High School in Panama City. Hart was given an acting scholarship to go to the college in Marianna, Florida.

Personal life and family
Hart is married to Anne Tabor. Hart has three children from a previous marriage, one of whom is author, actress, comedian, and YouTuber Mamrie Hart.

Musical career
Hart recorded the song "Let It Snow" for the 1991 In the Heat of the Night Christmas CD Christmas Time's A Comin'''. He was joined on the recording by A-Team Nashville studio pianist Hargus "Pig" Robbins. The song was produced by co-stars Randall Franks and Alan Autry.

 Filmography 

 Television 
 The Practice – "Black Widows" (2000) as Detective Cranston
 Party of Five – "Tender Age" (1998) as Carlin
 Before Women Had Wings – (1997) as the sheriff
 Picket Fences – "To Forgive is Divine" (1996) as Dan Patterson
 A Father for Charlie – (1995) as Woodrow
 In the Heat of the Night (1988-1995) as Officer and Sergeant Parker Williams
 Aaron's Way – "Patches of Light" (1988) as Travis

 Films 
 Forgiven: The Legend of Jake Kincaid (2002) as Sheriff Bob Logan
 Before Women Had Wings (1999) as  Sheriff
 Standoff (1998) as  Agent Blond
 Land of the Free (1997) as  Byrd
 To the Limit (1995) as  Bodyguard
 A Father for Charlie (1995) as  Woodrow
 Three Wishes (1995) as  Brian's Father
 The Real McCoy (1993) as  Business Man
 In the Line of Duty (1991)
 Disorganized Crime (1989) as  Proprietor
 The House on Carroll Street (1988) as Stage Manager
 War Party (1988) as  Rookie Cop
 Pat Hobby Teamed with Genius (1987)
 Legal Eagles (1986) as Marchek
 Silver Bullet (1985) as  Pete Sylvester
 Fandango (1985) as  Cecil
 The River (1984) as  Harley
 The Island'' (1980) as  Attendant

References

External links 

1954 births
Living people
American Episcopalians
American male film actors
American male television actors
Chipola College alumni
Male actors from Florida
People from Marianna, Florida